The 1996 IIHF Women's Pacific Rim Championship was an international ice hockey tournament held between April 1 and 6, 1996, in Richmond, British Columbia, Canada.

Canada won their second title in this event completing a 100% record in this competition as it was the last year that it was held. The Canadians won all of their games defeating the United States 4-1 in the final.

Teams and format
Four teams completed in this tournament. The teams were:
 
 
 
 

The teams first played a full round robin against each other. After these three games, all teams proceeded to the semi-final (1st vs 4th and 2nd vs 3rd) with the winning teams meeting in the final.

First round

Standings

Results

Play-off round

Final round

Semi-finals

Match for third place

Final

Champions

Final standings

See also
 1995 Women's Pacific Rim Championship

External links

 1996 Pacific Rim Tournament

Pacific
Pacific
1996
Pacific
Pacific
Pacific
Ice hockey in British Columbia
Pacific
Pacific
Richmond, British Columbia